Michael "Mickey" Halika (born November 11, 1978 in Jerusalem) is a former Israeli swimmer.

Swimming career

Despite being of Israeli nationality he won the 400 metres medley titles in 1996 and 1999 at the ASA National British Championships.

At the 1997 Maccabiah Games, he won gold medals in 800 m freestyle and 400 m medley in the juniors.

He competed in three events at the 2000 Summer Olympics in Sydney, Australia as a member of the Israeli swimming team.

In 2000 in Athens he won a bronze medal in the 400 IM at the FINA Short Course World Championships. In 2003 he won bronze in the 400 IM at the Summer Universiade in South Korea.

At the 2005 Maccabiah Games, he won a gold medal in the 400 m medley, setting a Maccabiah record.

At the 2009 Maccabiah Games, he won a gold medal in the 200 m individual medley.

References

External links
 

1978 births
Living people
Israeli Jews
Israeli male swimmers
Olympic swimmers of Israel
Male medley swimmers
Male butterfly swimmers
Swimmers at the 2000 Summer Olympics
Jewish swimmers
Maccabiah Games medalists in swimming
Competitors at the 1997 Maccabiah Games
Competitors at the 2005 Maccabiah Games
Competitors at the 2009 Maccabiah Games
Sportspeople from Jerusalem
Maccabiah Games gold medalists for Israel
Medalists at the FINA World Swimming Championships (25 m)
European Aquatics Championships medalists in swimming
Universiade medalists in swimming
Universiade silver medalists for Israel
Universiade bronze medalists for Israel
Medalists at the 1997 Summer Universiade
Medalists at the 1999 Summer Universiade
Medalists at the 2003 Summer Universiade
21st-century Israeli people